São Bento Palace ( "Saint Benedict's Palace") in Lisbon is the seat of the Assembly of the Portuguese Republic, the parliament of Portugal. Originally constructed in 1598, São Bento has served as the seat of Portugal's parliament since 1834, when the former monastery of the Benedictine Order was dissolved after the Liberal Wars. During the Portuguese constitutional monarchy, the palace served as the seat of the Cortes Gerais, the traditional parliaments of Portugal, until 1910.

São Bento Mansion, the official residence of the Prime Minister of Portugal, is located within the grounds of São Bento Palace.

History

The Palace has its origin in the first Benedictine monastery of Lisbon, established in 1598. In 1615, the monks settled in the area of the Casa da Saúde (Health House), that housed people sick with the plague. The new monastery was built during the 17th century following a Mannerist project by Jesuit architect Baltazar Álvares, later followed by João Turriano. The large building, of rectangular shape, had a church flanked by two towers, four cloisters, dormitories, kitchen, etc. When the construction works of the new building were almost finished, the destructive 1755 Lisbon earthquake damaged it.

Parliament
After the Liberal Revolution (1820) and the suppression of religious orders in Portugal (1834), the monks were expelled from the monastery and the Cortes Geraes (Portuguese parliament) was installed in the building, then called Palácio das Cortes or Parlamento. From then on, the old monastery was systematically adapted to its new functions. The first architect in charge was Possidónio da Silva, who designed the first session rooms.

The Chapter house (meeting place of the monks) of the monastery was totally remodeled by French architect Jean François Colson into a session room in 1867. The Portuguese Chamber of Peers met here until 1910, followed by the Senate and later the Corporative Chamber in this room, until the 1976 Constitution established unicameralism.

In 1895, a fire destroyed the session room of the lower house, and it was necessary to repair and expand the Parliament building. Portuguese architect Miguel Ventura Terra was put in charge of the remodeling project, which lasted until the 1940s. Ventura Terra built a new session room for the lower house (inaugurated in 1903) and altered the facade of the building, adding a neoclassical portico with columns and a triangular pediment. He also remodeled the atrium, the monumental inner stairway and many other rooms. The works were continued in the 1920s by architect Adolfo Marques da Silva.

In the 1940s, during Salazar's Estado Novo regime, the monumental stairway in front of the portico of the Parliament was completed. The stairway was designed by Cristino da Silva, who was also responsible for the project of the gardens in the back of the Palace.

Since Portugal became a democracy after the 1974 Carnation Revolution the area in front of the palace has been the most popular location for demonstrations held in Lisbon.

In 1994–1997 an annex building was constructed near the old Palace. This modern structure was designed by Fernando Távora and allowed for an expansion of the space of the Portuguese Assembly without altering its historical outlook.

The Palace of Saint Benedict has been classified as a National Monument since 2002.

Prime Minister's Residence

Just behind the main building there is a mansion that serves as residence for the Prime Minister of Portugal. The mansion, dated from 1877, was built within the garden of the old monastery. It has been the Prime Minister's official residence since 1938, when Salazar moved in.

References

External links 

Virtual visit to the Palace in the official site of the Portuguese Parliament.

Buildings and structures completed in 1938
Legislative buildings in Europe
Seats of national legislatures
Palaces in Lisbon
National monuments in Lisbon District